Keepers may refer to:
 Keepers (novel), a 2005 novel written by Gary A. Braunbeck
 "Keepers" (Journeyman), the sixth episode of the first season of Journeyman
 Keepers: Greatest Hits, a Tracy Byrd album
 Keepers (Guy Clark album), 1997
 Keepers, a 1997 album by Merl Saunders
 Keepers (film), a 2018 British film
 William Keepers Maxwell Jr. (1908–2000), American novelist and editor
 Races of the Mass Effect universe#Keepers, an alien race in the Mass Effect universe

See also
 Keep (disambiguation)
 Keeper (disambiguation)
 The Keeper (disambiguation)
 Keeping
 Kept, a reality television series